McCracken is an unincorporated community in Christian County, in the U.S. state of Missouri.  It is about 3.3 miles east of Ozark, Missouri.

History
The McCracken area got rail service when a subsidiary of the St. Louis–San Francisco Railway (Frisco) extended a line from Ozark, Missouri to Chadwick, Missouri in the Spring of 1883.  A post office called McCracken was established in 1896, and remained in operation until 1932. The community was named after Samuel McCracken, a local merchant.  McCracken in the 1890's was a thriving community with a general mercantile store, a blacksmith shop, several other business establishments, and even a mobile photography studio parked on the rail siding offering portrait pictures at $3/dozen.  But passenger service on the Frisco line was discontinued in March of 1933, and in 1934 the line from Ozark to Chadwick was abandoned entirely.

References

Unincorporated communities in Christian County, Missouri
Unincorporated communities in Missouri